The following outline provides an overview of and topical guide to lichens.

Lichen – composite organism made up of multiple species – a fungal partner, one or more photosynthetic partners, which can be either green algae or cyanobacteria, and, in at least 52 genera of lichens, a basidiomycete yeast.

What is a lichen? 

A lichen can be described as all of the following:
 Life form – an entity that is alive
 Composite organism – symbiotic life form composed of multiple partners from different biological domains, families and kingdoms, and different phyla, classes and divisions within those domains and kingdoms
 Eukaryote (domain) – organisms with a cell nucleus within a nuclear envelope
 Fungi (kingdom) – the fungal partner (known as the mycobiont) and any basidiomycete yeast partner
 Ascomycota (phylum) and/or Basidiomycota (phylum)
 Chlorophyta (division) – if the photosynthetic partner, or photobiont, is a green alga
 Trebouxiophyceae (class)
 Trebouxiaceae (family)
 Ulvophyceae (class)
 Trentepohliaceae (family)
 Prokaryote (domain) – organisms without a cell nucleus
  Bacteria (domain) – if the photobiont is a cyanobacterium
 Cyanobacteria (phylum)

Nature of lichens

Morphology 
 Lichen anatomy and physiology
 Lichen morphology – a lichen's appearance is very different from that of its individual partners
 Apoplast – the symbiotic interface zone, outside the cell membranes or walls of the mycobiont and photobiont
 Ascocarp – the fruiting body of a lichen, which contains the asci
 Ascus (plural asci) – a sexual, fungal spore-bearing structure, typically sac-like
 Ascospore – a fungal spore, the product of meiosis, produced in an ascus
 Epispore – a transparent bag-like outer covering on some spores, which helps to determine spore shape
 Cephalodium (plural cephalodia) – a gall-like structure that contains cyanobacteria
 Hypha (plural hyphae) – a long, branching, thread-like structure composed of one or more fungal cells, which typically makes up a large part of lichens; hyphae are densely compacted in the cortex and more loosely interwoven in the medulla
 Haustorium (plural haustoria) – a root-like structure which allows the fungal partner to extract nutrients from the photosynthetic partner
 Pycnidium (plural pycnidia) – a flask-shaped, asexual fruiting body possessed by some lichens
 Conidium (plural conidia) – an asexual fungal spore produced in pycnidia by some lichens
 Rhizine – a root-like structure that anchors a lichen to the substrate on which it grows
 Soralium (plural soralia) – a localized region or structure, typically a crack or pore, containing soredium
 Soredium (plural soredia) –  asexual reproductive propagules composed of loose aggregates of fungal hyphae and photobiont cells, produced in soralia
 Thallus (plural thalli) – the vegetative body of a lichen, made up of both mycobiont and photobiont components
 Cortex – the lichen's outer layer(s), made up of tightly woven fungal filaments
 Isidium (plural isidia) – outgrowths of the thallus which contain photobiont cells and provide means of vegetative reproduction for some lichens
 Medulla – a loose layer of interwoven fungal hyphae within the thallus
 Podetium (plural podetia) – an upright secondary thallus, which serves as the fruiting structure of Cladonia species

Ecology 

 Symbiosis in lichens – the relationship between the lichen partners can be complicated; while generally mutualistic, sometimes it is not. Recent research also shows other partners, including bacteria and "accessory" fungi, may be involved
 Asexual reproduction in lichens – many lichens reproduce asexually, using one or more of various methods which allow the dispersal of bundles of both fungal hyphae and photobionts
 Sexual reproduction in lichens – most lichens reproduce sexually using ascospores, which means they have to acquire their photobiont partners somehow after germinating
 Lichens and nitrogen cycling – some lichens (in particular those with cyanobacteria as a photobiont) can fix nitrogen
 Lichen biogeography – the study of the current distribution of extant lichens and the reasons for those distributions
 Lichen resynthesis – lichens can be artificially "recreated" by combining partners in a lab
 Lichens and pedogenesis – lichens contribute to the formation of soil by breaking down rock
Biological soil crust – lichens are among the common dominant biota in biocrusts, one of the world's largest environmental community types in terms of area covered
 Photosynthesis in lichens

Types of lichens

Lichen lists

Lichen taxonomical classifications 

Lichen systematics – Although they are composite organisms, lichens have traditionally been classified on the basis of their fungal partner. These span eight different biological classes, 38 orders, 119 families, and around 1,000 genera.
 Ascolichen – a lichen whose fungal partner is a member of the Ascomycota, one of the two main fungal divisions
 Basidiolichen – a lichen whose fungal partner is a member of the Basidiomycota, the other of the two main fungal divisions; these are far fewer in occurrence than ascolichens

Classes 
Lichens fall into eight fungal classes and several subclasses:

 Agaricomycetes
 Agaricomycetidae
 Arthoniomycetes
 Coniocybomycetes
 Dothideomycetes
 Dothideomycetidae
 Eurotiomycetes
 Chaetothyriomycetidae
 Lecanoromycetes
 Acarosporomycetidae
 Lecanoromycetidae
 Ostropomycetidae
 Lichinomycetes
 Sordariomycetes
 Sordariomycetidae
</div>

Orders

They are split across 40 orders. Those which cannot be assigned to a particular order are assigned instead to "incertae sedis" within the appropriate class. These orders were listed in Lücking, Hodkinson and Leavitt's 2016 treatise on the classification of lichenized fungi, except where otherwise noted. Updated in 2020.

 Acarosporales
 Agaricales
 Arthoniales
 Atheliales
 Baeomycetales
 Caliciales
 Candelariales
 Cantharellales
 Capnodiales
 Chaetothyriales
 Collemopsidiales
 Coniocybales
 Corticiales
 Eremithallales
 Graphidales
 Lecanorales
 Lecideales
 Lepidostromatales
 Leprocaulales
 Lichinales
 Monoblastiales
 Odontotrematales
 Ostropales
 Peltigerales
 Pertusariales
 Phaeomoniellales
 Pleosporales
 Pyrenulales
 Rhizocarpales
 Sarrameanales
 Schaereriales
 Strigulales
 Teloschistales
 Thelenellales
 Thelocarpales
 Trypetheliales
 Umbilicariales
 Verrucariales
 Vezdaeales
 Xylariales
</div>

Families 
They fall into 120 families. Those which cannot be assigned to a particular family are assigned instead to "incertae sedis" within the appropriate order. These were listed in Lücking, Hodkinson and Leavitt's 2016 treatise on the classification of lichenized fungi, except where otherwise noted. Updated in 2020.

Genera 
Extant lichens are found in around 1000 genera. These were listed in Lücking, Hodkinson and Leavitt's 2016 treatise on the classification of lichenized fungi, except where otherwise noted.

Species 
About 20,000 species of lichen have been described, and taxonomists estimate that the number of as yet undescribed species may be as high as 8,000 more.

Lichens, by growth form 

Lichen growth forms – These vary depending on the species:
 Byssoid – wispy, with the appearance of teased wool
 Crustose – paint-like appearance that adheres tightly to the underlying substrate
 Areolate – crustose, but divided into rounded or polygonal pieces by means of cracks
 Calicioid – crustose growth with small fruiting bodies which resemble sewing pins
 Placodioid – crustose in the centre and lobed at the periphery
 Filamentous – thin, threadlike growth, often with a matted appearance
 Foliose – flattened, leafy appearance
 Fruticose – shrubby, bush-like or coral-like appearance
 Gelatinous – jelly-like interior, due to presence of cyanobacteria
 Leprose – powdery or granular appearance
 Squamulose – scaly, sometimes leafy appearance; can resemble a foliose lichen but usually has no outer cortex
 Cladoniform – squamulose, but with fruticose podetia

Lichens, by substrate 

Lichens can be classified by the substrate on which they grow:
 Bryophilous lichen – on mosses or liverworts
 Hepaticolous lichen – on liverworts
 Muscicolous lichen – on mosses
 Corticolous lichen – on bark
Ramicolous lichen – on twigs
 Foliicolous lichen – on plant leaves
 Epiphyllous lichen – on the upper surface of a leaf
 Hypophyllous lichen – on the lower surface of a leaf
 Lichenicolous lichen – on other lichens
 Lignicolous lichen – on wood
 Omnicolous lichen – on various different substrates, including manmade structures
 Plasticolous lichen – on plastic
 Saxicolous lichen – on stone
 Terricolous lichen – on soil
 Vagrant lichen – loose, on no substrate

Lichens, by region

Africa 

 Lichens of Madagascar
 Lichens in Namibia

Antarctica

Asia 

 List of lichens of Sri Lanka

Australia 

 List of lichens of Western Australia

Europe 

 List of lichens of Sweden

North America 

 List of lichens of Maryland
 List of lichens of Soldiers Delight – lichens of a nature reserve in Maryland
 List of lichen species of Montana
 Lichens of the Sierra Nevada (U.S.)

Oceania

Pacific

South America

Photobiont 

Photobiont – the photosynthetic partner in a lichen
 Cyanolichen – a lichen with a cyanobacteria photobiont
 List of lichen photobionts

Lichen metabolites 

Lichen product – organic products, known as secondary metabolites, produced by lichens; these provide a variety of protections for the lichen – from microbes, viruses, herbivores, radiation, oxidants and more
 List of lichen products

Study of lichens 

Lichenology – the study of lichens
 Acharius Medal – awarded for lifetime achievement in lichenology
 Evolution of lichens – lichenization of fungi has occurred multiple times, and several pathways towards acquiring photobionts have arisen
 Fossil lichens
 Exsiccata (plural exsiccatae) – a published set of preserved specimens, numbered and distributed with printed labels
 History of lichenology
 Lichenometry – a process where measuring the growth of a lichen colony over time can be used to estimate the minimum age of the substrate on which it is growing
 Spot test (lichen) – chemical tests used to aid in species identification

Threats 

 Lichenicolous fungus – parasitic fungus that uses lichens as a host
 List of lichenicolous fungi
 Lichens as bioindicators – lichens are sensitive to various pollutants and can be thus be used as bioindicators
 Lichens and air pollution – many lichens are sensitive to various forms of air pollution
 Lichens and climate change – the inability of algae to quickly evolve means that climate change may adversely impact lichens

Lichens in culture 

 Edible lichen – some lichens have traditionally been used as food
 Ethnolichenology – a branch of ethnobotany that studies human usage of lichens
 Lichens in popular culture
 Trouble with Lichen – novel by John Wyndham

Lichen organizations 
 American Bryological and Lichenological Society (ABLS)
 The Bryologist – peer-reviewed journal published by ABLS
 Australasian Lichen Society 
 Australasian Lichenology – official publication of the Australasian Lichen Society
 British Lichen Society (BLS)
 The Lichenologist – peer-reviewed journal published by the BLS
 Bryological and Lichenological Association for Central Europe (BLAM)
 Herzogia – peer-reviewed journal published by BLAM
 Bryological and Lichenological Working Group (Bryologische en Lichenologische Werkgroep, BLWG)
 Buxbaumiella – peer-reviewed journal published by BLWG
 Dutch Bryological and Lichenological Society 
 Lindbergia – peer-reviewed journal co-published by the Dutch Bryological and Lichenological Society and the Nordic Bryological Society
 Indian Lichenological Society
 International Association for Lichenology (IAL)
 Nordic Bryological Society

Independent lichenological journals 
 Asian Journal of Mycology – an international peer-reviewed journal published by Mae Fah Luang University in Thailand
 Bibliotheca Lichenologica – scientific monographs on lichens and mosses
 Hattoria – an international, peer-reviewed journal issued by Hattori Botanical Laboratory
 International Journal of Mycology and Lichenology

See also 
Glossary of lichen terms

Citations

References

External links 

 About Lichens, from the British Lichen Society
 Australian Lichens, from the Australian National Herbarium and Australian National Botanic Gardens 
 Lichen Basics, from the North American Mycological Association

Lichens
Lichens